CNA may refer to:

Certifications 
 Certification and Accreditation
 Certified National Accountant
 Certified Novell Administrator
 Certified Nursing Assistant

Education 
 College of the North Atlantic, public college in Newfoundland
 Republic of China Naval Academy, in Taiwan

Organizations 
 California Nurses Association
 Canadian Nuclear Association
 Canadian Nurses Association
 Chin National Army
 CNA (nonprofit), the Center for Naval Analyses
 Center for Transportation and Logistics Neuer Adler
Centre for Nonviolent Action, Bosnia and Serbia
 Royal Canadian Numismatic Association
 National Audiovisual Council, Romania
 Centre national de l'audiovisuel, Luxembourg
 CVE (Common Vulnerabilities and Exposures) Numbering Authority

Companies 
 Canadian Numbering Administrator
 China Northern Airlines
 CNA Financial Corporation
 Compagnia Nazionale Aeronautica, an Italian aircraft manufacturer of the 1930s
CNA (bookstore), a South African chain founded in 1896

News agencies 
 Caribbean News Agency
 Catholic News Agency
 Central News Agency (disambiguation), any of several news agencies
 CNA (TV network), a television network based in Singapore, formerly known as Channel NewsAsia
 Cyprus News Agency

People
 Go C-Na (born 1974), Japanese composer
 Chimamanda Ngozi Adichie (born 1977), Nigerian writer
 C. N. Annadurai (1909–1969), Indian politician

Technology 
 Computer network attack, one type of computer network operations (CNO) in U.S. military doctrine
 Converged network adapter, a computer interface for both general-purpose and storage networks
 CVE Numbering Authority, an entity responsible for assigning Common Vulnerabilities and Exposures identifiers

Other uses 
 Central Neo-Aramaic, a language
 Child Nutrition Act
 Copy number abnormality, in genomics
 Cartoon Network Arabic, a TV channel

See also